Ingerana is a genus of frogs in family Dicroglossidae. These frogs are distributed in southeastern Asia, from Nepal, northeastern India, and southwestern China to Indochina, Borneo, and the Philippines. They are sometimes known as the eastern frogs.

Species
With the placement of Ingerana baluensis being enigmatic, several species having been transferred to Limnonectes in 2013 (Ingerana alpina, Ingerana liui, Ingerana medogensis, Ingerana xizangensis), and one species being transferred to Minervarya in 2022 (Ingerana charlesdarwini) this genus is left the following species:

 Ingerana borealis (Annandale, 1912)
 Ingerana reticulata (Zhao & Li, 1984)
 Ingerana tenasserimensis (Sclater, 1892)

References

 
Dicroglossidae
Amphibians of Asia
Amphibian genera